The Sanen River is a river in southern East Java province, Java island, Indonesia, about 800 km east of the capital Jakarta.

Geography
The river flows in the southeast area of Java with predominantly tropical monsoon climate (designated as Am in the Köppen–Geiger climate classification). The annual average temperature in the area is 22 °C. The warmest month is October, when the average temperature is around 23 °C, and the coldest is February, at 21 °C. The average annual rainfall is 2511 mm. The wettest month is January, with an average of 498 mm rainfall, and the driest is August, with 33 mm rainfall.

See also
List of rivers of Indonesia
List of rivers of Java

References

Rivers of East Java
Rivers of Indonesia